The 2022 W Series Singapore round was the  season finale of the 2022 W Series, which took place at the Marina Bay Street Circuit, Singapore. The event was an undercard to the 2022 Formula One World Championship round at the same circuit.

Originally scheduled at Suzuka International Racing Course for the W Series' debut at an Asian country, it was cancelled due to "unforeseeable operational challenges". The round was also scheduled to be the seventh of nine rounds in the championship, before all remaining rounds were canceled due to financial issues.

Classification

Practice

Qualifying

Race

Notes

References

External links
 Official website

W Series Singapore
Grand Prix
W Series Singapore
Singapore